R. Grant Smith (born 1939) is an American diplomat and previous United States Ambassador to Tajikistan.

Smith, originally from New Jersey, served in the foreign service in India and Nepal and was Deputy Ambassador of the U.S. Embassy in New Delhi. He also served as Director of the South Asia Office at the U.S. State Department.

He is a senior fellow at the Central Asia-Caucasus Institute at Johns Hopkins University.

References

Sources
Brief bio at Moynihan Institute
The Political Graveyard: Index to Politicians: Smith, O to R

1939 births
Living people
Ambassadors of the United States to Tajikistan
20th-century American diplomats